The Norwegian Engineers' and Managers' Association (FLT) is a trade union representing supervisors and technicians in the private sector in Norway.

The union was founded in 1951, as the Norwegian Association of Supervisors and Technical Officials.  It affiliated to the Norwegian Confederation of Trade Unions.  By 2019, it had 21,266 members.

References

External links

Trade unions established in 1951
Trade unions in Norway